One third of Welwyn Hatfield Borough Council in Hertfordshire, England is elected each year, followed by one year without election. Since the last boundary changes in 2008, 48 councillors have been elected from 16 wards.

Political control
Since the first election to the council in 1973 political control of the council has been held by the following parties:

Leadership
The leaders of the council since 2005 have been:

Council elections
1973 Welwyn Hatfield District Council election
1976 Welwyn Hatfield District Council election (New ward boundaries)
1979 Welwyn Hatfield District Council election
1980 Welwyn Hatfield District Council election
1982 Welwyn Hatfield District Council election
1983 Welwyn Hatfield District Council election
1984 Welwyn Hatfield District Council election
1986 Welwyn Hatfield District Council election (District boundary changes took place but the number of seats remained the same)
1987 Welwyn Hatfield District Council election
1988 Welwyn Hatfield District Council election
1990 Welwyn Hatfield District Council election
1991 Welwyn Hatfield District Council election (New ward boundaries)
1992 Welwyn Hatfield District Council election
1994 Welwyn Hatfield District Council election (District boundary changes took place but the number of seats remained the same)
1995 Welwyn Hatfield District Council election
1996 Welwyn Hatfield District Council election
1998 Welwyn Hatfield District Council election
1999 Welwyn Hatfield District Council election (New ward boundaries increased the number of seats by one)
2000 Welwyn Hatfield District Council election
2002 Welwyn Hatfield District Council election
2003 Welwyn Hatfield District Council election
2004 Welwyn Hatfield District Council election
2006 Welwyn Hatfield District Council election
2007 Welwyn Hatfield Borough Council election
2008 Welwyn Hatfield Borough Council election (New ward boundaries)
2010 Welwyn Hatfield Borough Council election
2011 Welwyn Hatfield Borough Council election
2012 Welwyn Hatfield Borough Council election
2014 Welwyn Hatfield Borough Council election
2015 Welwyn Hatfield Borough Council election
2016 Welwyn Hatfield Borough Council election (New ward boundaries)
2018 Welwyn Hatfield Borough Council election
2019 Welwyn Hatfield Borough Council election
2021 Welwyn Hatfield Borough Council election
2022 Welwyn Hatfield Borough Council election

By-election results

1997-2001

2001-2005

2005-2009

2009-2013

2013-2017

References

By-election results

External links
Welwyn Hatfield Borough Council

 
Local elections
Council elections in Hertfordshire
Welwyn Hatfield